= Diabetes, Obesity and Metabolism =

- Discipline: Diabetology, endocrinology, metabolism, pharmacology
- Language: English
- Edited by: R. Donnelly, P. Welsh

Publication details
- History: 1999–present
- Publisher: Wiley-Blackwell
- Frequency: Monthly
- Impact factor: 5.7 (2024)

Standard abbreviations
- ISO 4: Diabetes Obes. Metab.

Indexing
- CODEN: DOMEF6
- ISSN: 1462-8902 (print); 1463-1326 (web)
- LCCN: 00244962
- OCLC no.: 605132321

Links
- Journal homepage; Online access; Online archive

Diabetes, Obesity and Metabolism is a monthly peer-reviewed medical journal established in 1999 covering research on diabetes, obesity, and metabolism. The journal has a 2024 Clarivate impact factor of 5.7.

The journal publishes on topics such as pharmacokinetics and pharmacodynamics, cost-effectiveness, real world evidence of drug utilisation, safety and effectiveness, as well as conventional randomized controlled trials (phase I-IV studies).
